Los Neuróticos is a 1971 Argentine comedy film co-written and directed by Héctor Olivera and starring Norman Briski, Susana Giménez and Victor Bo. It was originally produced and finished in 1969, but it was banned by the Argentine Classification Board (which was in charge of censoring films) during the following years.

The film underwent several cuts to submit it again in order to receive classification, but in September of 1971 the censors maintained their decision to ban the film. After several cuts and a new ratification in October, the film was finally authorized to be released in November 1971.

Synopsis 
The story of a psychoanalyst whose only goal is to impress the attractive women who attend his group therapies.

Cast
 Víctor Bó
 Norman Briski
 Horacio Bustos
 Susana Giménez
 Marcela López Rey
 Ana María Montero
 Malvina Pastorino
 Héctor Pellegrini
 Linda Peretz
 Nathán Pinzón
 Raúl Ricutti
 Jorge Salcedo
 Soledad Silveyra

External links

 

1971 films
Argentine comedy films
1970s Spanish-language films
1971 comedy films
Films directed by Héctor Olivera
1970s Argentine films